The Ethiopia national basketball team represents Ethiopia in international competitions. It is administrated by the Ethiopian Basketball Federation (E.B.F.). (Amharic: የኢትዮጵያ ቅርጫት ኳስ ፌዴሬሽን)

Ethiopia joined FIBA in 1949 and has Sub-Saharan Africa's longest basketball tradition. A founding member of the FIBA Africa Championship, the team once belonged to Africa's top 5 basketball teams. Since the mid-1960s, however, the team lost its international significance. Today, it aims to return to former glory.

Competitive record

Summer Olympics
yet to qualify

FIBA Basketball World Cup
yet to qualify

FIBA Africa Championship

African Games
yet to qualify

Current roster
At the AfroBasket 2007 qualification: (last publicized squad)

|}
| valign="top" |
Head coach

Assistant coaches

Legend
Club – describes lastclub before the tournament
Age – describes ageon 15 August 2007
|}

Depth chart

At the 2007 AfroBasket qualification, Gosaye Asefa Shenkutie led the team in points.
Omod Oman Ogud led his team in rebounds, Simon Tsegaye Kidane led his team in assists.

See also
Ethiopia national under-16 basketball team
Ethiopia national football team
Eyassu Worku

References

External links
 Ethiopia Basketball Federation at Twitter
 Ethiopia at the FIBA website.
 Ethiopia at Africabasket.com
 Archived records of Ethiopia team participations

Men's national basketball teams
Basketball
Basketball teams in Ethiopia
1949 establishments in Ethiopia